The Gouin Reservoir is a man-made lake, fully within the boundaries of the City of La Tuque, Quebec, Canada. It is not one contiguous body of water, but the collective name for a series of connected lakes separated by innumerable bays, peninsulas, and islands with highly irregular shapes. It is the source of the Saint-Maurice River.

This large reservoir extends into the cantons of (in order, in row from north to south):
 Mathieu, Verreau;
 Lacasse, Toussaint, McSweeney, Magnan, Lindsay;
 Hanotaux, Cremazie, Lemay, Marmette, Brochu, Déziel;
 Poisson, Evanturel, Myrand, Chapman, Nevers, Aubin, Levasseur;
 Achintre, Sulte, Huguenin, Delage, Leblanc, Bureau.

Recreational tourism activities
There are also a number of outfitters offering recreational tourism activities such hunting trips, fishing trips, excursions in all-terrain vehicles (ex.: snowmobiles, VTT), nautical expeditions, photographic hunting, lodging in cottages, in house-boat, in hostel (auberge)... Many of these outfitters also provide equipment supply and maintenance services related to recreational tourism activities. Generally, each outfitter is equipped with a marina offering various boating services.

History
The reservoir is named after Jean Lomer Gouin, who was Premier of Quebec when, in 1918, the Shawinigan Water & Power Company impounded the reservoir for hydroelectric development. The Gouin Reservoir has a 600 MW station for local use, but is used to control the flow of the St-Maurice River for the stations down-stream (all operated now by Hydro-Québec).

Initially, the "Commission des eaux courantes du Québec" (English: Quebec Running Water Board) wanted to facilitate the floating of wood that was routed via the Saint-Maurice River, to the paper mills of La Tuque to Trois-Rivières. The first work was built on La Loutre rapids in 1916-1917. The Shawinigan Water & Power Company decided to raise the level of the reservoir in 1948 and it was also decided to divert the headwaters of the Mégiscane River and the Suzie River, which flowed naturally to James Bay via the Mégiscane River, the Bell River (Quebec) and the Nottaway River; and to bring their waters to the Saint Lawrence River by the Saint-Maurice River. A series of dikes and canals were needed to divert the water from these rivers and still today; these works are unknown to the general public.

Village of Obedjiwan
The small Atikamekw community of Obedjiwan is located on the reservoir's north shore.

During the construction of the first Loutre dam (the name given to the dam prior to the Gouin name as it is known today), the Amerindians lived near Obedjiwan Lake, which was flooded when the reservoir was filled. At that time, the residents moved and rebuilt their village on the site of the present village of Obedjiwan, Quebec.

Village of Oskélanéo

The village of Oskélanéo is connected to Gouin Reservoir via Oskélanéo Lake and Oskélanéo River. This river flows on the south shore of Bureau Lake (Gouin Reservoir). The village of Oskélanéo was formed following the arrival in 1910 of the transcontinental railway; the station was designated "Oskélanéo River". Through the railway, the village became a supply depot and access point to the Rupert River, Mistassini Lake and other areas of northern Quebec. It also became a starting point for hunting and fishing expeditions in the region, as well as for forestry projects.

Geography

Road accesses
Although no paved road leads to the Gouin Reservoir, it is nevertheless accessible by several forested pathways, snowmobile trails and by air. The hydrographic slope of the Gouin Reservoir is accessible by:
 North side: route 212 from the village of Obedjiwan, Quebec and heading northeasterly following more or less the north shore of the Gouin reservoir, to the Normandin Lake (Normandin River) area. From Obedjiwan, Quebec, the forested road R1045 and R2046 are serving the North-West area of the reservoir;
 East side: the forest road 451 connecting Gouin Dam, the village of Wemotaci and La Tuque to the south; this road section serves in particular the valley of the Wapous River and Berlinguet Lake;
 South side: the forest road 400 serves the south-east part of the reservoir by passing to the Gouin Dam; Forest Road 404 serves the southwestern portion between the villages of Clova, Quebec and Parent;
 West side: the forested road R1009 (North-South direction) located west of the Pascagama River is serving the West coast of Gouin Reservoir.

Access by waterway from the railway
Outdoor enthusiasts can reach the Gouin Reservoir by canoe waterway from the Canadian National line connecting La Tuque to Senneterre, passing to the south of the reservoir (railway stops in order from west to east):

West part of the reservoir
 Kekek River:  ride from "Rouleau Siding" downstream to the confluence of the Mégiscane River; path with R1 and R1-2 level rapids and some thresholds. Note: as a variant, the hobbyists may also take the Trévet River course (tributary of the Kekek River);
 Suzie River:  to Du Poète Lake (Mégiscane River) with some obstacles. Note: Brécourt Lake and Du Poète Lake (Mégiscane River) are diverted to the Gouin Reservoir via the Adolphe-Poisson Bay;
 Mégiscane River:  to reach the Mégiscane dam on the Lac du Poète; route with some rapids that are generally easy to cross;
 Flapjack River:  to reach Mattawa Bay; navigable at all times and in both directions;
 Lacs Arcand and Tessier:  to reach the Saraana Bay, with some rapids. This route is navigable at all times in both directions.

Centre part of the reservoir
 Oskélanéo River:  to reach the South Bay Bureau Lake (Gouin Reservoir). This route is the busiest, being navigable at all times with river boats and easily in reverse.

The village of Parent and the village of Clova, Quebec, both now part of the City of La Tuque.

A seaplane base is located at the top of the Gouin dam.

Main tributaries
The main rivers flowing into the Gouin reservoir are (clockwise from the Gouin dam):

South Shore
 Jean-Pierre River (Gouin Reservoir)
 Atimokateiw River
 De La Galette River (Gouin Reservoir)
 Leblanc River (Gouin Reservoir)
 Wacekamiw River (via Mikisiw Armirikana Lake)
 Nemio River (via Bureau Lake)
 Oskélanéo River (via Bureau Lake)
 Mistatikamekw River
 outlet of Tessier Lake (Gouin Reservoir) (via Saraana Bay)
 Faucher River
 Flapjack River (via Mattawa Bay)
 Bignell Creek (via Adolphe-Poisson Bay)

West Shore
 Mégiscane River (upper part deviated by the dam of Du Poète Lake (Mégiscane River) to Adolphe-Poisson Bay)
 Suzie River (course deviated by the dam of Du Poète Lake (Mégiscane River) to Adolphe-Poisson Bay)
 Plamondon Creek (Gouin Reservoir) (via Plamondon Bay)
 Piponisiw River (via Simard Lake (Gouin Reservoir) and Du Mâle Lake (Gouin Reservoir))

North Shore
 De la Rencontre Creek (via Du Mâle Lake (Gouin Reservoir))
 Toussaint River (via Kamitcikamak Lake)
 Mathieu River
 Kakospictikweak River (via Omina Lake)
 Pokotciminikew River
 Wawackeciw River
 Kakiskeaskoparinaniwok River (linking Omina Lake and Verreau Bay)
 Eau Claire Creek (Gouin Reservoir) (via Verreau Bay)
 Ohomisiw River (via Eau Claire Creek)

East Shore
 Verreau Creek (linked to Verreau Bay)
 Sakiciw River (linked to Magnan Lake)
 Barras Creek (linked to Magnan Lake)
 Oskatcickic Brook
 Papactwe Creek (linked to Magnan Lake)
 Kiackw River (linked to Magnan Lake)
 Wapous River (via Déziel Lake)
 Au Vison River (via Au Vison Bay)
 Au Vison River West (via Au Vison Bay)

Main bays
This large reservoir has many bays and islands making navigation complex. Before the existence of geolocation systems that developed in the 2000s, many navigators lost their way on the water.
(Clockwise, from the mouth)

South Shore

West Shore
 Hanotaux Bay (linked to Du Mâle Lake)
 Wacapiskitek Bay (linked to Du Mâle Lake)

North Shore

East Shore

Bays of Islands

Main islands
(Clockwise, from the mouth)

South area

North area

East area
 Tciman Island (in Magnan Lake)
 Amérique Island (in Brochu Lake)
 Oasis Island (forming the boundary between Marmette Bay South and Nevers Lake (Gouin Reservoir))

Main lakes
The main lakes included in the reservoir or related are: Toussaint, Magnan, McSweeney and Du Mâle Lake. (Clockwise, from the mouth)

South area
 Nevers Lake (linking Chapman Lake (Gouin Reservoir) and Brochu Lake)
 Chapman Lake (Gouin Reservoir) (linking Du Mâle Lake)
 Kaackakwakamak Lake (linked to Magnan Lake)
 Mikisiw Amirikanan Lake (linked to Ganipi Bay)
 Bureau Lake (linked on North to Toussaint Lake (Gouin Reservoir))

West area
Saveney Lake (linked to Adolphe-Poisson Bay)
 Miller Lake (linked to Du Mâle Lake (Gouin Reservoir))
 Simard Lake (linked to Miller Lake)
 Lacasse Lake (linked to Miller Lake)
 Du Mâle Lake (linked to Plamondon Creek and De la Rencontre Creek)

North area

East area
 Brochu Lake (linked to Kikendatch Bay, which is related to Gouin Dam)
 Little Brochu Lake
 Déziel Lake (Gouin Reservoir) (linking Wapous River to Gouin Reservoir)
 Du Déserteur Lake (Gouin Reservoir)
 Minikanakik Lake (linked to Déziel Lake)
 Duchet Lake (on an island of Center-East part of the reservoir)
 Kamoskosoweskak Lake (on an island of Center-East part of the reservoir)

Main passes
The many passes between the islands or peninsulas facilitate navigation on the reservoir.(Clockwise, from the mouth)

Fauna

Fish
Fish species present include the walleye, northern pike, and sauger. Fishers sometimes catch lake trout and brook trout, but these species are more marginal because this vast body of water is the ideal reference point for pike, which is very fond of small fish.

Waterfowl
Waterfowl present in the region include the American black duck (Anas rubripes), mallard (Anas platyrhynchos), green-winged teal (Anas crecca), ring-necked duck (Aythya collaris), common merganser (Mergus merganser), hooded merganser (Lophodytes cucullatus), common goldeneye (Bucephala clangula), bufflehead (Bucephala albeola), common loon (Gavia immer), Canada goose (Branta canadensis), bald eagle (Haliaeetus leucocephalus).

Mammals
The main mammals in Haute-Mauricie are: moose, white-tailed deer, bears, hares, red foxes, muskrats, skunks and raccoons.

The fishermen are required to comply with the regulations, especially when the number of catch. Depending on the season, hunting is also regulated by territory, type of game and type of weapon.

Gouin Reservoir Community Wildlife Area
The "Gouin Reservoir Community Wildlife Area" works to preserve the diversity of wildlife, improve the quality of fishing and protect it. In its role of surveillance of the territory, this non-profit organization collaborates with the Ministry of Forests, Wildlife and Parks (MFFP) to maintain a good management of the fish resource.

References

External links

Lakes of Mauricie
Reservoirs in Quebec
Hydro-Québec
Tourist attractions in Mauricie
Landforms of La Tuque, Quebec
Hydrological system of Saint-Maurice